Ups and Downs is an Australian pop band. Their single "The Living Kind" was nominated for the ARIA Award for Best New Talent at the ARIA Music Awards of 1987.

History

1983-1990
Ups and Downs was formed in Brisbane in 1983 by brothers Greg and Darren Atkinson with John Flade. Peter Shaw soon joined the lineup. After the release of two singles through Basketcase in 1984, they relocated to Sydney, where they built a cult following.

In 1986 they released the single "The Living Kind" through True Tone which saw them nominated for an ARIA Award at the ARIA Music Awards of 1987.

In 1987 Trevor O'Neil joined the band. They signed with Mushroom Records and released their debut album Underneath the Watchful Eye in 1988. Flade left the band in 1989 and they released one more EP before breaking up in 1990.

2007-present
In 2007 they played at Pig City, a celebration of Brisbane music, and for the 4ZZZ Flashback, a 40th anniversary of the Brisbane radio station.

They reformed in 2011 for a series of shows and they released a compilation album of old tracks, Out of the Darkness: Sleepless, Singles & Other Stories.

In 2017 they released their album "The Sky's In Love With You" on Basketcase Records, with bass player Alex Ronayne.

In September 2019, they recorded a cover version of The Hummingbirds' "Two Weeks With a Good Man in Niagara Falls" for the Shake Yer Popboomerang Volume 3 compilation. Before re-recording and releasing "Ups and Downs", which was featured on the 1983 cassette Darling It's Wonderful.

Band members

Members 
Darren Atkinson - drums, vocals
Greg Atkinson - bass, vocals
John Flade - guitar
Trevor O'Neil - keyboards
Peter Shaw - guitar
Alex Ronayne - bass

Discography

Studio albums

Compilation albums

Extended plays

Singles

Awards and nominations

ARIA Music Awards
The ARIA Music Awards is an annual awards ceremony that recognises excellence, innovation, and achievement across all genres of Australian music. They commenced in 1987.

|-
| ARIA Music Awards of 1987
| themselves
| ARIA Award for Best New Talent
|

Countdown Australian Music Awards
Countdown was an Australian pop music TV series on national broadcaster ABC-TV from 1974–1987, it presented music awards from 1979–1987, initially in conjunction with magazine TV Week. The TV Week / Countdown Awards were a combination of popular-voted and peer-voted awards.

|-
| 1986
| themselves 
| Most Promising New Talent
| 
|-

References

Australian pop music groups
Musical groups established in 1983
Musical groups disestablished in 1990